Cai Jianjiang (born 1963) is a Chinese executive and politician who is the current director of the Office of the Central Air Traffic Management Commission. Previously he served as chairman and party branch secretary of China National Aviation Holding.

He was an alternate member of the 19th Central Committee of the Chinese Communist Party and is a member of the 20th Central Committee of the Chinese Communist Party.

Biography
Cai was born in Wuxi, Jiangsu, in 1963. He attended Wuxi Meicun High School. After resuming the college entrance examination, in 1979, he was accepted to the Civil Aviation University of China, where he double majored in navigation control and English language and literature. After graduating in 1983, he stayed at the university and taught there.

Cai worked in Shenzhen Airlines before being assigned to Air China in 2001, and eventually becoming its party secretary in September 2004 and chairman in February 2007. He concurrently served as chairman of Shenzhen Airlines Co., Ltd. since April 2010.

He was promoted to general manager of China National Aviation Holding in January 2014. In December 2016, he was promoted again to become chairman and party branch secretary.

In October 2020, he was appointed director of the Office of the Central Air Traffic Management Commission, a position at ministerial level.

References

1963 births
Living people
People from Wuxi
Civil Aviation University of China alumni
Academic staff of Civil Aviation University of China
People's Republic of China politicians from Jiangsu
Chinese Communist Party politicians from Jiangsu
Alternate members of the 19th Central Committee of the Chinese Communist Party
Members of the 20th Central Committee of the Chinese Communist Party